Aeroflot Flight 5463 was a Soviet domestic passenger flight from Chelyabinsk to Almaty which crashed on 30 August 1983 while approaching Almaty. As a result of the accident, all ninety people on board were killed. Crew error was cited as the cause of the accident.

Accident
Having received the information about the aircraft's location, air traffic control (ATC) gave an erroneous instruction to turn. The crew also mistakenly chose a heading of 199 degrees instead of 140. Having informed ATC of their situation, the crew received a ground proximity warning. Instead of making an urgent climb, the crew delayed any attempt to climb until 1–2 seconds before impact.

Investigation
The crash of Flight 5463 was attributed to the following causes:-

Violation of the approved approach scheme to Alma-Ata airport
Failure of the executive flight manager to monitor the situation
Violation of the flight operations manual by the crew for following the instructions of the final controller to descend below a safe altitude.

References

External links
 Aeroflot Flight 5463 at Aviation Safety Network

1980s in the Kazakh Soviet Socialist Republic
1983 in the Soviet Union
5463
Airliner accidents and incidents involving controlled flight into terrain
Airliner accidents and incidents caused by pilot error
Aviation accidents and incidents caused by air traffic controller error
Aviation accidents and incidents in 1983
Aviation accidents and incidents in Kazakhstan
Aviation accidents and incidents in the Soviet Union
Accidents and incidents involving the Tupolev Tu-134
August 1983 events in Asia
1983 disasters in the Soviet Union